Stenolis giesberti is a species of beetle in the family Cerambycidae. It was described by Monne in 2011.

References

Stenolis
Beetles described in 2011